Hendrik Johannes Nicasius "Nyck" de Vries (born 6 February 1995) is a Dutch racing driver currently competing in Formula One for Scuderia AlphaTauri. He won the 2020–21 Formula E World Championship and the 2019 FIA Formula 2 Championship, as well as the 2010 and 2011 Karting World Championships. He was signed to the McLaren young driver programme from January 2010 until May 2019. De Vries made his Formula One debut in September 2022 as a substitute for Williams at the 2022 Italian Grand Prix.

Early career

Karting 
In 2008, De Vries won the WSK World Series for the KF3 category, as well as the German Junior Championship. In 2009 he retained both his German Junior and WSK World Series titles, as well as winning the European KF3 Championship. In September he won the 2010 Karting World Championship. He also won the World Championship in 2011.

Formula Renault Eurocup

2012 

In 2012, De Vries switched to single-seaters, being given a cockpit in the Eurocup Formula Renault 2.0 at R-ace GP. De Vries achieved his first podium finish at his debut race in Alcañiz with a second place, and he managed to repeat this result at the Hungaroring. De Vries finished the season in fifth place, beating all of his teammates. In addition, De Vries took part in several races of the Formula Renault 2.0 NEC, in which he managed a victory at his home track in Assen. He was on the podium four times in eleven starts in the series and ended up tenth in the drivers' standings.

2013 
The following year De Vries switched to Koiranen GP for his second season in the series. He won one race each at the Hungaroring and the Circuit de Catalunya and again ended the season in fifth place in the championship.

2014 
In 2014, De Vries stayed with Koiranen and competed in his third season of the Eurocup. He won six races and finished on the podium in 11 of 14 races. With 254 points to 124, he convincingly beat the runner-up Dennis Olsen in the championship. In addition, he took part in the entire Alpine Formula Renault season. He won 10 out of 14 races and only failed to make the podium twice.

Formula Renault 3.5 Series 
In 2015, De Vries made the switch to the Formula Renault 3.5 Series, racing for DAMS. He was on the podium five times before winning the final race of the season at the Circuito de Jerez, putting him third in the final standings with 160 points, only placing behind Oliver Rowland and Matthieu Vaxivière.

GP3 Series 
De Vries took part in the GP3 Series in 2016 in with ART Grand Prix. He scored his first podium at the Red Bull Ring with a third place, then obtained his first pole in Budapest. It wasn't until the second race at Monza that he took his first win, a result he replicated at the Yas Marina Circuit at the end of the season. He finished sixth in the championship, behind his teammates Charles Leclerc and Alexander Albon, who became champion and vice-champion respectively.

FIA Formula 2 Championship

2017 
In 2017, De Vries switched to the FIA Formula 2 Championship with Rapax. He achieved his first win in the Monte Carlo sprint race and scored a further three podium finishes before the summer break. Before the round at Spa-Francorchamps De Vries switched to Racing Engineering, with whom he scored a second place at that very round. He ended his season seventh in the championship, placing second-highest of all rookies.

2018 

For the 2018 season, De Vries moved to partner Sean Gelael at Prema Racing. His season started slowly with just two podiums from the opening third of the season putting him a fair way behind his title rivals. De Vries' first victory of the campaign in the sprint race at Le Castellet was followed by a point-less round in Austria and two finishes outside the top five in Silverstone. Following that however the Dutch driver's form improved, winning the feature races in Hungary and Belgium respectively. However, even with his sixth podium of the season in the Sochi feature race, De Vries was unable to finish in the top three in the standings, being beaten by Alex Albon and Lando Norris by ten and 17 points respectively.

2019 

In 2019, De Vries remained in Formula 2, returning to his former team ART Grand Prix alongside 2018 GP3 vice-champion Nikita Mazepin. His season started in strong fashion with a podium in Baku and a sprint race victory in Barcelona. He followed that up with a win from pole position in Monaco and took the championship lead by winning the main race at Le Castellet. A pair of third places at the Red Bull Ring and a podium each in Silverstone and Budapest extended De Vries' advantage, and following another pair of thirds in Monza he had put one hand onto the trophy. After his fourth and final victory of the season, which came at the penultimate round in Sochi, De Vries was mathematically crowned Formula 2 champion.

FIA World Endurance Championship 

On 15 March 2018, De Vries signed at Racing Team Nederland to compete in the LMP2 class. He won the 6 hours of Fuji on 6 October 2019 with this team, their first win in this class. De Vries drove the last stint and put the car over the finish line.

On 6 July 2020, De Vries was announced as the Toyota Gazoo Racing Europe GmbH test and reserve driver. His roles include testing the Toyota TS050 Hybrid and Toyota's hypercar.

During the test week prior to the 2022 24 Hours of Le Mans the ACO officials prohibited TDS Racing x Vaillante driver Philippe Cimadomo to start. Due to his reserve role for the Toyota Hypercar team, he was already on the circuit and was asked to step in. Because of the bronze status of Philippe Cimadomo and the platinum status of De Vries, the car was moved from Pro/Am to Pro.

Formula E

2019–20 season 
On 11 September 2019, De Vries was announced as a driver for the new Mercedes-Benz EQ Formula E Team for the 2019–20 Formula E season alongside Stoffel Vandoorne, after failing to find a seat in Formula One for the 2020 Formula One season. The team finished the season with a 1–2, Vandoorne leading De Vries, who finished the season in 11th with 60 points.

2020–21 season 
For the 2020–21 season, De Vries continued at the renamed Mercedes-EQ Formula E Team with Stoffel Vandoorne. He qualified on pole for the first race of the season-opening Diriyah ePrix double-header, proceeding to lead every lap en route to his first-ever victory in the series. Before the second race De Vries did not take part in qualifying as Mercedes and Venturi Racing, who were both using Mercedes powertrains, were suspended from the session following the crash of Edoardo Mortara during a practice start procedure. In the race the Dutchman finished ninth after penalties were issued to multiple cars. At the round in Rome De Vries failed to score points in both races, having collided with his teammate Vandoorne and Sam Bird respectively in the two races. De Vries achieved his second victory of the season in Valencia, where he was one of the only drivers to not run out of usable energy before the end of the race.

Following two rounds in which he only amassed a total of two points, De Vries fought for victory in both races of the London ePrix and finished in second place in both races, thus taking the lead of the championship before the final round. In the first race in Berlin he did not score any points but managed to maintain his lead in the standings. Having qualified 13th for the final race of the season, De Vries was given an early advantage when title rivals Mitch Evans and Edoardo Mortara collided at the start and fellow contender Jake Dennis was involved in a crash shortly after the restart. De Vries finished the race in eighth place, thus winning his first ever World Championship in Formula E. The Dutchman ended the campaign with a total of two wins, four podiums and 99 points, seven ahead of vice-champion Mortara.

2021–22 season 
De Vries and Stoffel Vandoorne remained with Mercedes for their swansong season in Formula E. De Vries won the first race of season 8 in Diriyah, and got pole the next day, but finished in 10th, and ended the championship in 9th with 106 points. De Vries left at the end of the season, securing a contract to compete in Formula One.

Formula One career 

De Vries was signed to the McLaren Young Driver Programme in 2010, and the Audi Sport Racing Academy in 2016. He left McLaren before the 2019 season to focus on his duties at Audi, where he stayed until September 2019.

Test and reserve driver
In December 2020, De Vries and Formula E teammate Stoffel Vandoorne performed their first Formula One test for the Mercedes team at the season-ending Young Driver Test. The following year he became one of the reserve drivers for the team, partnering his Mercedes-EQ teammate Stoffel Vandoorne in the role.

He made his Formula 1 practice debut at the 2022 Spanish Grand Prix, where he took Alex Albon's place at Williams for the hour-long session. For the French Grand Prix, De Vries ran in another practice session at Mercedes, taking seven-time World Champion Lewis Hamilton's place. De Vries then again drove a Mercedes in free practice for the Mexico City Grand Prix in place of George Russell.

In September, De Vries tested the Alpine A521 at the Hungaroring, alongside Antonio Giovinazzi and Jack Doohan.

For the 2022 São Paulo Grand Prix, De Vries was appointed as Lando Norris' replacement at McLaren in case Norris was unable to race, as the English driver was suffering from food poisoning after a meal on Thursday. De Vries even had a seat fitting with the McLaren car. However, Norris finally recovered the next day and was able to compete the Grand Prix.

Race debut on loan to Williams (2022) 
At the Italian Grand Prix, De Vries took part in first practice in place of Sebastian Vettel at Aston Martin. De Vries then replaced Alex Albon at Williams for third practice, qualifying, and the race, after Albon suffered appendicitis and was ruled out on Saturday morning. He managed to advance to Q2 and qualify thirteenth, ahead of his Williams teammate Nicholas Latifi. He started eighth after penalties were applied to multiple drivers. He finished the race in ninth position, scoring points on his race debut and rewarded with Driver of the Day by fans.

AlphaTauri (2023–) 
De Vries is driving for Scuderia AlphaTauri for the 2023 season, replacing Alpine-bound Pierre Gasly.

De Vries qualified 19th for the season-opening Bahrain Grand Prix. He finished 14th in the race, three places behind his teammate.

IndyCar Series 
De Vries took part in an IndyCar test with Meyer Shank Racing at Sebring International Raceway on 6 December 2021, alongside his Formula E teammate Stoffel Vandoorne, who tested for Arrow McLaren SP, Callum Ilott and Jack Aitken. Four-time Indianapolis 500 winner Helio Castroneves helped familiarize De Vries with the Dallara DW12. He set the fastest times in the test amongst the four drivers.

Karting record

Karting career summary

Racing record

Racing career summary

† As De Vries was a guest driver, he was ineligible for championship points.
* Season still in progress.

Complete Eurocup Formula Renault 2.0 results 
(key) (Races in bold indicate pole position) (Races in italics indicate fastest lap)

Complete Formula Renault 3.5 Series results
(key) (Races in bold indicate pole position) (Races in italics indicate fastest lap)

Complete GP3 Series results
(key) (Races in bold indicate pole position) (Races in italics indicate fastest lap)

Complete FIA Formula 2 Championship results
(key) (Races in bold indicate pole position) (Races in italics indicate points for the fastest lap of top ten finishers)

† Driver did not finish the race, but was classified as he completed over 90% of the race distance.

Complete Formula E results
(key) (Races in bold indicate pole position; races in italics indicate fastest lap)

Complete Formula One results 
(key) (Races in bold indicate pole position) (Races in italics indicate fastest lap)

 Season still in progress.

Complete FIA World Endurance Championship results
(key) (Races in bold indicate pole position; races in italics indicate fastest lap)

† As De Vries was a guest driver, he was ineligible for championship points.

Complete 24 Hours of Le Mans results

Complete European Le Mans Series results
(key) (Races in bold indicate pole position; results in italics indicate fastest lap)

References

External links
 
 
 Nyck de Vries: "I’m aiming for the title" - World Series By Renault

1995 births
Living people
Dutch racing drivers
Dutch people of Indonesian descent
Karting World Championship drivers
People from Sneek
Formula Renault 2.0 NEC drivers
Formula Renault Eurocup drivers
Formula Renault 2.0 Alps drivers
World Series Formula V8 3.5 drivers
Dutch GP3 Series drivers
FIA Formula 2 Championship drivers
FIA Formula 2 Champions
Formula E drivers
Formula E Champions
Dutch Formula One drivers
Williams Formula One drivers
AlphaTauri Formula One drivers
R-ace GP drivers
Koiranen GP drivers
DAMS drivers
ART Grand Prix drivers
Rapax Team drivers
Racing Engineering drivers
Prema Powerteam drivers